Sar Gaz Dehnow (also known as Sar Gaz Dehnow-ye ‘Olyā) is a village in Hur Rural District, in the Central District of Faryab County, Kerman Province, Iran. At the 2006 census, its population was 197, in 47 families.

References 

Populated places in Faryab County